Al Hamraniyah' is the name of a settlement in Ras Al Khaimah.

Populated places in the Emirate of Ras Al Khaimah